The Prince Alwaleed Bin Talal Center for Muslim-Christian Understanding (ACMCU) is an interfaith institution based at the Georgetown University School of Foreign Service in Washington.

Overview
The institution was founded at Georgetown University in 1993 as the Center for Muslim-Christian Understanding. It is housed within the Georgetown University School of Foreign Service.

In 2005, a wealthy Saudi prince and businessman, Al-Waleed bin Talal in 2005, gave $20 million to the Center to promote interfaith understanding and the study of Islam and the Muslim world. The center was renamed in his honor. The $20 million gift was the second-largest ever given to the Georgetown at that point. Bin Talal simultaneously gave $20 million to Harvard University's interdisciplinary Islamic studies program and $15 million to establish American studies programs at the American University in Beirut and American University in Cairo.

The founding director of the center was John Esposito. Esposito was succeeded by John O. Voll.

The Center is co-publisher (with the UK's Birmingham University Centre for the Study of Islam and Christian-Muslim Relations) of the journal Islam and Christian-Muslim Relations.

In 2008, Republican U.S. Representative Frank Wolf questioned the prince's gift, and whether the center had ever been critical of the Saudi government.

References

External links

1993 establishments in Washington, D.C.
Middle Eastern studies in the United States
Christian and Islamic interfaith dialogue
Georgetown University programs
Interfaith organizations
Religious pluralism